João Paulo Fernandes may refer to:
 João Paulo Fernandes (boccia)
 João Paulo Fernandes (footballer)